The ophthalmic nerve (V1) is a sensory nerve of the face. It is one of three divisions of the trigeminal nerve (CN V). It has three branches that provide sensory innervation to the eye, the skin of the upper face, and the skin of the anterior scalp.

Structure 
The ophthalmic nerve is the first branch of the trigeminal nerve (CN V). It is joined by filaments from the cavernous plexus of the sympathetic, and communicates with the oculomotor, trochlear, and abducent nerves. It gives off a recurrent (meningeal) filament which passes between the layers of the tentorium.

Branches 
The ophthalmic nerve divides into three major branches as it passes through the superior orbital fissure.
The nasociliary nerve gives off several sensory branches to the orbit. It then continues out through the anterior ethmoidal foramen, where it enters the nasal cavity. It provides innervation for much of the anterior nasal mucosa. It also gives off a branch which exits through the nasal bones to form the external nasal nerve.
The lacrimal nerve passes through the orbit superiorly to innervate the lacrimal gland and part of the upper eyelid.
The frontal nerve passes through the orbit superiorly. It passes through the supraorbital foramen to provide sensory innervation for the skin of the forehead and scalp through the supraorbital nerve and the supratrochlear nerve.

Function 
The ophthalmic nerve supplies branches to the cornea, ciliary body, and iris; to the lacrimal gland and conjunctiva; to the part of the mucous membrane of the nasal cavity; and to the skin of the eyelids, eyebrow, forehead and nose.

It is the smallest of the three divisions of the trigeminal, and arises from the upper part of the trigeminal ganglion as a short, flattened band, about 2.5 cm. long, which passes forward along the lateral wall of the cavernous sinus, below the oculomotor and trochlear nerves; just before entering the orbit, through the superior orbital fissure, it divides into three branches, lacrimal, frontal, and nasociliary.

It carries sensory branches from the eyes, conjunctiva, lacrimal gland, nasal cavity, frontal sinus, ethmoidal cells, falx cerebri, dura mater in the anterior cranial fossa, superior parts of the tentorium cerebelli, upper eyelid, dorsum of the nose, and anterior part of the scalp.

Roughly speaking, the ophthalmic nerve supplies general somatic afferents to the upper face, skull, and eye:
 Face: Upper eyelid and associated conjunctiva. Eyebrow, forehead, scalp all the way to the lambdoid suture.
 Skull: Roof of orbit, frontal, ethmoid, and possibly sphenoid sinuses.
 Eye: The eye itself (all the intraocular structures such as cornea) and the lacrimal gland and sac.

Compare this to the maxillary nerve, which supplies general somatic afferents to the mid-face and skull:
 Face: Lower eyelid and associated conjunctiva. Cheek, upper lip.
 Skull: Orbital floor, maxillary sinus, upper teeth, nasal cavity, and palate, cheekbone.

Clinical significance 
Damage to the ophthalmic nerve can cause loss of sensation of the structures it supplies in the face. The corneal reflex may be lost, which can increase the risk of damage to the cornea.

Additional images

References

External links 
 
 
 

 
Trigeminal nerve
Sensory systems